The canton of Jussey is an administrative division of the Haute-Saône department, northeastern France. Its borders were modified at the French canton reorganisation which came into effect in March 2015. Its seat is in Jussey.

It consists of the following communes:
 
Aboncourt-Gesincourt
Aisey-et-Richecourt
Alaincourt
Ambiévillers
Arbecey
Augicourt
Barges
La Basse-Vaivre
Betaucourt
Betoncourt-sur-Mance
Blondefontaine
Bougey
Bourbévelle
Bourguignon-lès-Morey
Bousseraucourt
Cemboing
Cendrecourt
Chargey-lès-Port
Charmes-Saint-Valbert
Chauvirey-le-Châtel
Chauvirey-le-Vieil
Cintrey
Combeaufontaine
Confracourt
Cornot
Corre
Demangevelle
Fouchécourt
Gevigney-et-Mercey
Gourgeon
Hurecourt
Jonvelle
Jussey
Lambrey
Lavigney
Magny-lès-Jussey
Malvillers
Melin
Molay
Montcourt
Montdoré
Montigny-lès-Cherlieu
La Neuvelle-lès-Scey
Oigney
Ormoy
Ouge
Passavant-la-Rochère
Pont-du-Bois
Preigney
Purgerot
La Quarte
Raincourt
Ranzevelle
La Roche-Morey
La Rochelle
Rosières-sur-Mance
Saint-Marcel
Selles
Semmadon
Tartécourt
Vauvillers
Vernois-sur-Mance
Villars-le-Pautel
Vitrey-sur-Mance
Vougécourt

References

Cantons of Haute-Saône